La Porte du Der is a commune in the Haute-Marne department of northeastern France. The commune was established on 1 January 2016 and consists of the former communes of Montier-en-Der and Robert-Magny.

Population

See also 
Communes of the Haute-Marne department

References 

Communes of Haute-Marne
States and territories established in 2016